S.T.A.L.K.E.R. is a first-person-shooter survival horror video game series developed by GSC Game World. The series is set in an alternate version of the present-day Chernobyl Exclusion Zone in Ukraine, where, according to the series' backstory, a mysterious second Chernobyl disaster took place in 2006. As a result, the physical, chemical, and biological processes in the area were altered, spawning numerous nature-defying anomalies, artifacts, and mutants. The player takes the role of a "stalker" - a name given to trespassers and adventurers who have come to explore the exclusion zone and its strange phenomena. 

The series is loosely based on the novel Roadside Picnic by Arkady and Boris Strugatsky, and influenced by the movie Stalker by Andrei Tarkovsky.  The name "S.T.A.L.K.E.R." is a backronym for Scavengers, Trespassers, Adventurers, Loners, Killers, Explorers and Robbers.

Setting

The franchise takes place in an alternate Chernobyl Exclusion Zone (or simply "the Zone"), where a number of classified laboratories were established following the nuclear disaster of 1986. Due to the experiments conducted in these laboratories, a second catastrophe occurred in 2006, which caused physical and meteorological phenomena all over the exclusion zone and mutation of local plant and animal life. After the second disaster, the Zone grew rich with anomalies — inexplicable phenomena that don't obey the laws of physics or common sense (such as pillars of fire, lightning scatter, whirlwinds that tear everything that falls into them, etc).

The anomalies are causing artifacts to appear, which are items with unique and extraordinary properties such as anti-gravity or radioactivity absorption. People who have come to explore the Zone in search of personal enrichment such as artifacts are known as "stalkers". Many of them are working on their own, though there are also several organized factions present. The Duty are a paramilitary organization that believes the Zone is a threat to humanity that must be destroyed. Conversely, members of the Freedom faction believe the Zone is a gift that should be freely accessible to all people. Bandits are wanted criminals and outlaws that have come to the Zone to hide from authorities, while the Clear Sky seek to understand the origins of the Zone. 

To protect the Zone from intruders, a military checkpoint known as the Cordon was established by the Ukrainian Military Forces. The military have an uneasy relationship with stalkers - while official orders are to shoot any trespassers on sight, military personnel are often bribed to look the other way. Additionally, military squads carry out operations in the Zone, such as elimination missions or securing strategic points. The most dangerous of the Zone dwellers are other stalkers, particularly a fanatical sect called the Monolith that protects the center of the Zone, and mutants, some of which possess psionic powers.

The protagonists in the series have different goals and allegiances, but often must work together. Typically, every game's primary goal is to reach the center of the Zone, with a number of adventures, dangers, and challenges on the way.

Plot

Shadow of Chernobyl (2007)

In the first game of the series, the player takes on the role of an amnesiac stalker referred to as the "Marked One", tasked with killing another stalker named Strelok. During the game, the protagonist uncovers clues to his past and true identity while helping other stalkers and encountering dangerous mutants. He also learns about the nature and origins of the Zone by exploring mysterious underground laboratories in the area. Shadow of Chernobyl features seven endings which are dependent on multiple factors such as money earned during the game, supporting certain factions, or how much of the protagonist's memory was pieced together.

Clear Sky (2008)

Clear Sky, the second game released in the series, is a prequel to Shadow of Chernobyl. The player assumes the role of Scar, a veteran mercenary and the lone survivor of a huge energy emission he was caught in while escorting a group of scientists through the Zone. He is rescued by and ends up working for a group calling themselves the "Clear Sky", who are dedicated to researching and understanding the nature of the Zone. Throughout the game, the player can choose to have Scar side with or against certain factions in the area to help achieve Clear Sky's goal.

Call of Pripyat (2009)

The third game in the series, Call of Pripyat, takes place shortly after the events of Shadow of Chernobyl. Having discovered the open path to the center of the Zone, the government decides to establish control of the situation through "Operation Fairway". This includes sending a number of reconnaissance helicopters into the Zone before dispatching the main military force thoroughly. Despite these preparations, the military operation fails, with all helicopters mysteriously crashing. As a result, the Security Service of Ukraine deploys former stalker turned military operative Major Alexander Degtyarev into the Zone to investigate.

Heart of Chornobyl (2023)

S.T.A.L.K.E.R. 2 was announced in August 2010, with an initial release date scheduled for 2012. Sergiy Grygorovych, CEO of GSC Game World, specified that the video game featured a completely new multi-platform engine, written by GSC itself. On 23 December 2011, GSC Game World announced they would be continuing development of S.T.A.L.K.E.R. 2, despite an earlier announcement pointing to its cancellation. However, S.T.A.L.K.E.R. 2 was cancelled yet again by GSC Game World through a Twitter post on 25 April 2012.

Development of a new S.T.A.L.K.E.R. 2 was announced on 15 May 2018 with a post on the Cossacks 3 Facebook page. The post links to a site that displays the text "S.T.A.L.K.E.R. 2 — 2.0.2.1.", implying a planned release year of 2021 powered by the Unreal Engine 4. In May 2018, Sergey Galyonkin, the creator of Steam Spy, tweeted that GSC Game World would create a S.T.A.L.K.E.R. 2, using Unreal Engine 4. Shortly the GSC website mentioned that the company was working on S.T.A.L.K.E.R. 2, and a teaser website appeared mentioning the release date of 2021. It was suggested that the game was still in the design phase, and was announced just before E3 2018 so it could find a publisher.

On 23 March 2020, GSC Game World published a screenshot of the game in development, promising they would share new information about the game in the coming months.

On 23 July 2020, it was announced that the game will be released in 2021 for Microsoft Windows and Xbox Series X/S, which will be the first time the series will be on consoles.

On 30 December 2020, an in-engine teaser of the game was released.

On 13 June 2021, the release date was confirmed for 28 April 2022 through a gameplay trailer at the E3 2021 Microsoft/Bethesda press conference. It also revealed it would be on Xbox Game Pass at launch. On 12 January 2022, the release date was delayed until 8 December 2022. 

After the Russian Invasion of Ukraine in February of 2022, it was announced that development had been put on an indefinite hold; however, after moving their development studio to the Czech Republic, the developers announced a 2023 release date via their official Discord server.

Reception

The S.T.A.L.K.E.R. series has positive reviews from popular gaming sites and was well received by critics. The series is scored between 75 and 82 on Metacritic.

By August 2010, the franchise had sold over 4 million copies. In August 2021, GSC and Koch Media is claiming over 15 million total sales for the franchise.

Board game
A board game is being developed by Awaken Realms.

Related games
In 2010 the first game of the Metro game series was released. Metro is another series of Ukrainian first-person shooter games based on the Metro 2033 literature series, which was created by some ex-members of the S.T.A.L.K.E.R. development team who left to form 4A Games in 2006 before the release of Shadow of Chernobyl.

The former S.T.A.L.K.E.R. 2 team opened a new studio, Vostok Games, in 2012. In 2015, they released a free-to-play massively multiplayer online first-person shooter game titled Survarium in the spirit of the franchise, using ideas they created for the cancelled sequel. Their new project is a battle royale game set in Chernobyl, titled Fear the Wolves.

In 2014, West-Games, which claimed to be composed of former S.T.A.L.K.E.R. core developers (according to both GSC Game World and Vostok Games, falsely) launched a Kickstarter campaign for a spiritual successor to S.T.A.L.K.E.R. first called Areal and then STALKER Apocalypse. While it managed to reach its goal of $50,000, multiple concerns were raised throughout the campaign about the project being a possible scam, and Kickstarter eventually suspended the campaign two days before its deadline, for undisclosed reasons.

In 2019, Alexey Sityanov, former game designer and story writer of Shadow of Chernobyl, Survarium and Sketch Tales, teamed up with The Farm 51 to work on their Kickstarter project, Chernobylite. The game features similar gameplay and themes to S.T.A.L.K.E.R, and the environment is based on the real Chernobyl exclusion zone, done by utilizing photogrammetry measurements. A stalker is introduced in the game as an antagonist, known as Black Stalker. Chernobylite released the first early access version of the game on 16 October 2019, on Steam.

References

External links

 
 S.T.A.L.K.E.R. 2 website

Fiction set in 2012
Alternate history video games
Chernobyl disaster in fiction
First-person shooters
Horror video games
Post-apocalyptic video games
Science fiction video games
Survival video games
S.T.A.L.K.E.R.
Video game franchises introduced in 2007
Video games developed in Ukraine
Windows games
Video games about zombies
Paranormal fiction